is a Japanese manga series written by Hiroyuki Nishimori and illustrated by Yuuki Iinuma. It was serialized in Shogakukan's shōnen manga magazine Weekly Shōnen Sunday from March 2014 to August 2015, with its chapters collected in seven tankōbon volumes.

Publication
Shogakukan collected its chapters in seven tankōbon volumes, released from July 18, 2014, to November 18, 2015.

Volume list

References

External links
 

Science fiction anime and manga
Shogakukan manga
Shōnen manga